Alan Armstrong, known professionally as Alun Armstrong, is an English character actor. He grew up in County Durham in North East England, and first became interested in acting through Shakespeare productions at his grammar school. Since his career began in the early 1970s, he has played, in his words, "the full spectrum of characters from the grotesque to musicals... I always play very colourful characters, often a bit crazy, despotic, psychotic".

His credits include several Charles Dickens adaptations, and the eccentric ex-detective Brian Lane in New Tricks. He is also an accomplished stage actor who spent nine years with the Royal Shakespeare Company. He originated the role of Thénardier in the London production of Les Misérables, and won an Olivier Award in the title role in Sweeney Todd: The Demon Barber of Fleet Street.

Early life
Born Alan Armstrong in Annfield Plain, County Durham, his father was a coal miner and both his parents were Methodist lay preachers. He attended Annfield Plain Junior School, then Consett Grammar School, where a teacher inspired him to try acting. In the lower sixth, he played Petruchio in The Taming of the Shrew, a role he later played with the Royal Shakespeare Company.

Armstrong took part in the National Youth Theatre summer school in 1964, but his background and northern accent made him feel out of place. He auditioned for RADA but was not accepted. He instead studied fine art at Newcastle University. He found the course pretentious and felt that he did not fit in, and he was sent down after two years when he stopped attending classes.

Armstrong had jobs with a bricklayer and as a gravedigger before he decided to try acting again. He started out as an assistant stage manager at the Cambridge Arts Theatre, then went on to a Theatre in Education company affiliated with the Sheffield Repertory Theatre. He also performed in several Radio 4 dramas.

Career

Film
Armstrong made his screen debut in Get Carter (1971). On learning that the film was being made in Newcastle, Armstrong wrote a letter to MGM, the studio making the film, and was invited to meet director Mike Hodges, who was keen to cast local actors.

Armstrong has appeared in a number of films, although usually in supporting roles. In A Bridge Too Far (1977), he had a small role as one of the British troops at the Battle of Arnhem. He played a French soldier, Lieutenant Lecourbe, in Ridley Scott's 1977 film The Duellists. He had a supporting role as the bandit leader Torquil in the 1983 fantasy film Krull.

His first cinematic lead role was as Maxwell Randall, the titular vampire in Alan Clarke's snooker musical Billy the Kid and the Green Baize Vampire (1987). Armstrong sang "I Bite Back".

In Patriot Games (1992), Armstrong played an SO-13 officer. In Braveheart (1995), he played the Scottish noble Mornay who betrayed William Wallace. He was the villainous Egyptian cult leader Baltus Hafez in The Mummy Returns (2001), and he portrayed Saint Peter with a Geordie accent in Millions (2004). He also had small roles as the High Constable in Sleepy Hollow (1999), Cardinal Jinette in Van Helsing (2004), Magistrate Fang in Roman Polanski's Oliver Twist (2005) and Uncle Garrow in Eragon (2006).

Television
Armstrong has had over 80 roles in television productions. During the 1970s, he appeared in various TV series, including episodes of Whatever Happened to the Likely Lads?, Porridge, Public Eye and The Sweeney.

He was cast in two mini-series dealing with coal miners in North East England. He played Joe Gowlan in The Stars Look Down (1974) based on the novel by A. J. Cronin and he appeared in Ken Loach's Days of Hope (1975) set in his native County Durham. In a 2007 interview, Armstrong singled out Days of Hope as a favourite: "I loved that because it was my own history and background that was being dramatised and, in a way, nothing gets better than that".

In the comedy series A Sharp Intake of Breath, he played a variety of characters who complicate the life of the main character played by David Jason. In 1977, he was the strict Deputy Headmaster in Willy Russell's Our Day Out, a television play about a group of poor schoolchildren on a daytrip. He also starred in the 1981 Yorkshire Television drama Get Lost!

Armstrong has portrayed characters from the works of Charles Dickens. He played Wackford Squeers and Mr. Wagstaff in the eight-hour Royal Shakespeare Company stage adaptation of The Life and Adventures of Nicholas Nickleby that was filmed for television in 1982. He has appeared in two versions of Oliver Twist: the 1999 ITV mini-series as Agnes Fleming's father Captain Fleming and the 2005 Roman Polanski film as Magistrate Fang. He has had roles in four BBC Dickens adaptations, as Daniel Peggotty in David Copperfield (1999); as Inspector Bucket in Bleak House (2005); as Jeremiah and Ephraim Flintwinch in Little Dorrit (2008); and as Hiram Grewgious in The Mystery of Edwin Drood (2012). Armstrong has been a fan of Dickens since reading David Copperfield aloud in school. He particularly remembered Dan Peggotty's houseboat on the beach, and in order to play the role he turned down an offer from Clint Eastwood, with whom he had worked on White Hunter Black Heart.

In the BBC drama series Our Friends in the North (1996), he played Austin Donohue, a character based on the politician T. Dan Smith. Armstrong portrayed 18th century politician Henry Fox in the BBC serial Aristocrats (1999). In the 2000 TV film This Is Personal: The Hunt for the Yorkshire Ripper, he portrayed George Oldfield, the Assistant Chief Constable for Crime at West Yorkshire Police whose health deteriorated during the investigation as he received messages purportedly from the killer. He was nominated for a Royal Television Society award for his role in This Is Personal.

In the second series of Bedtime (2002), he played a widower concerned about his son's suspicious behaviour. He and Brenda Blethyn co-starred in Between the Sheets (2003) as a frustrated married couple in sex therapy. In an adaptation of Carrie's War, he played a strict man who reluctantly takes in two children evacuated to Wales during World War II.

Armstrong is known for his role as Brian Lane in the BBC One series New Tricks about a group of former police detectives who help investigate unsolved and open cases for London's Metropolitan Police. The character of Brian Lane is an obsessive and socially inept recovering alcoholic who has a great capacity for remembering details of old cases and colleagues. In August 2012, Armstrong announced he would leave the show after the tenth series. The announcement followed comments by the cast in an interview with the Radio Times that criticised some of the series' writing, and which drew an angry rebuttal from the show's writer-director Julian Simpson.

During the run of New Tricks, Armstrong continued to take on other projects. He starred in the 2004 TV film When I'm 64 about a lonely retired schoolteacher who starts a relationship with another man. He chose the role, despite his apprehension about filming a love scene with co-star Paul Freeman, because he thought it was a lovely and thought-provoking story. He also starred in The Girls Who Came to Stay (2006), about a British couple who take in two girls exposed to the effects of the Chernobyl disaster, and Filth (2008), as the husband of "Clean-Up TV" activist Mary Whitehouse.

For three series from 2009 to 2011, he played William Garrow's mentor John Southouse in the BBC period legal drama Garrow's Law. In 2012, he played the Earl of Northumberland in the BBC2 adaptations of Henry IV, Parts I and II. His son Joe Armstrong played Northumberland's son Hotspur. In the 2014 Showtime horror series Penny Dreadful, Armstrong played Vincent Brand, an actor who gives Frankenstein's monster a job at the Grand Guignol. He guest starred in the 2014 Christmas special of Downton Abbey, and took the role of Clifford Bentley in ITV police drama Prime Suspect 1973.

Theatre
In addition to his film and television work, Armstrong has acted in many theatre productions. One of his early roles was Billy Spencer in David Storey's play The Changing Room at the Royal Court Theatre directed by Lindsay Anderson in 1971. In 1975, he played Touchstone in As You Like It directed by Peter Gill at the Nottingham Playhouse.

Armstrong spent nine years with the Royal Shakespeare Company from 1979 to 1988. On tour and at the Donmar Warehouse in 1979–80, he played Dogberry in Much Ado About Nothing and Azdak in The Caucasian Chalk Circle.

In 1981, Armstrong joined the cast of the eight-hour production of The Life and Adventures of Nicholas Nickleby as Wackford Squeers. The company went on tour to perform on Broadway at the Plymouth Theatre. The play was filmed for television at the Old Vic Theatre in 1982.

In productions at the Royal Shakespeare Theatre, the Theatre Royal, Newcastle, and the Barbican Theatre in 1982–83, Armstrong played Trinculo in The Tempest and Petruchio in The Taming of the Shrew with Sinéad Cusack as Kate. In 1983, he played Ralph Trapdoor in The Roaring Girl starring Helen Mirren. He performed the roles of Leontes in The Winter's Tale and John Proctor in The Crucible on a national tour that included Christ Church, Spitalfields in 1984 and on tour to Poland in 1985. In 1985–86, he played Thersites in Troilus and Cressida.

In the autumn of 1985, Armstrong took on what is perhaps his best-known stage role: Thénardier in the original London production of Les Misérables. Thénardier and his wife, played by Susan Jane Tanner, are innkeepers whose shady practices are revealed in the song "Master of the House." Armstrong described Thénardier as "a gruesome and comic character."

Armstrong was one of the first to be cast, along with fellow Royal Shakespeare Company members Sue Jane Tanner and Roger Allam. He was involved in fleshing out his role, particularly in the second act song "Dog Eats Dog." He was surprised by the success of Les Misérables "because it is different to other musicals. Different because it is a sung musical throughout and also a little operatic; I didn't think it would be very popular." He left the production after a year because he became bored with the repetition and wanted to move on to other things.

He sings on Original London Cast Recording. He reprised the role, paired with Jenny Galloway as Mme. Thénardier, in Les Misérables - The Dream Cast in Concert at the Royal Albert Hall in October 1995, which was filmed and released on DVD. He also appeared in the 25th anniversary concert, though Matt Lucas performed the role of Thénardier.

Armstrong received nominations in two categories for the 1985 Olivier Award: Outstanding Performance by an Actor in a Musical for Les Misérables and Actor of the Year for The Crucible and The Winter's Tale. In 1988, he was again nominated for the Olivier Award for the roles of Barabas in an RSC production of The Jew of Malta and the Captain in a National Theatre production of The Father by August Strindberg. The New York Times review of The Father said: "At its imploding center is the superb actor Alun Armstrong... 'To eat or be eaten, that is the question,' says the captain. By evening's end, Mr. Armstrong seems to have been devoured alive by his inner demons..."

During the short run of the musical The Baker's Wife at the Phoenix Theatre in 1989–90, he played the role of the baker Aimable Castagnet. The production, directed by Trevor Nunn, received positive reviews but did not attract large audiences and closed after 56 performances. He was nominated for an Olivier Award for Outstanding Performance of the Year by an Actor in a Musical.

Armstrong won the Olivier Award for Best Actor in a Musical in 1994 for his performance as Sweeney Todd in the 1993 London revival of the musical at the National Theatre. The play also won for Best Musical Revival and his co-star Julia McKenzie won Best Actress in a Musical.

At the Donmar Warehouse, Armstrong appeared as Albert Einstein in Terry Johnson's Insignificance in 1995, and he played Hamm in Samuel Beckett's Endgame in 1996. He starred as Willy Loman in a 1996–97 National Theatre production of Death of a Salesman. In 1997–98, he appeared in a production of the comedy The Front Page directed by Sam Mendes at the Donmar Warehouse. The Independent review noted: "As for Alun Armstrong, we don't meet him until late in the second of three acts but he dominates the entire evening. He barks, bleats and bellows across the stage, grabbing Hildy and the show by the scruff of the neck and hurtling through to a zinger of a climax."

Armstrong took the lead role at short notice in Shelagh Stephenson's play Mappa Mundi in 2002, replacing Ian Holm who withdrew due to illness. In 2006, he returned to the stage to star in Trevor Nunn's production of The Royal Hunt of the Sun at the National Theatre. At the Proms in 2012, he played Alfred Doolittle in a performance of My Fair Lady starring Annalene Beechey and Anthony Andrews. Armstrong stars in a 2014 production of Ionesco's black comedy Exit the King at the Theatre Royal, Bath's Ustinov Studio.

Personal life
Armstrong and his wife, Sue, have three sons: Tom, Joe (also an actor), and Dan. Father and son played older and younger versions of the same character in the 2010 BBC drama A Passionate Woman, and they played Northumberland and his son Hotspur in the 2012 BBC adaptation of Henry IV. Dan was a musician in the band Clock Opera. Armstrong appeared in the music video for their song "The Lost Buoys".

In July 2009, Armstrong was awarded two honorary degrees in recognition of his contributions to the arts. He received an Honorary Doctorate of Letters from the University of East Anglia and an Honorary Doctorate of Arts from the University of Sunderland. The theatre at the Civic Hall in Stanley, County Durham, near Armstrong's hometown, was named after him in 2014.

Armstrong is a supporter of AFC Wimbledon, as is his character in New Tricks.

Filmography

Film

Television

Theatre

Radio 

 2018 The Case of Charles Dexter Ward. BBC Radio 4.

References

External links
 
 Alun Armstrong at the BFI Database

1946 births
Living people
People from Annfield Plain
Actors from County Durham
English male film actors
English male stage actors
English male television actors
English male voice actors
Laurence Olivier Award winners
People educated at Consett Grammar School
Royal Shakespeare Company members
20th-century English male actors
21st-century English male actors
National Youth Theatre members